Balleza may refer to:

Balleza Municipality, a municipality of Chihuahua, Mexico
Balleza River, a river of Mexico

People with the surname
Roman Balleza (born 1984), American songwriter

See also
Mariano Balleza, a town in Chihuahua, Mexico